Picropharmacolite, Ca4Mg(AsO3OH)2(AsO4)2·11H2O, is a rare arsenate mineral.  It was named in 1819 from the Greek for bitter, in allusion to its magnesium content, and its chemical similarity to pharmacolite.  The mineral irhtemite, Ca4Mg(AsO3OH)2(AsO4)2·4H2O, has the same composition as picropharmacolite, except that it has only four water molecules per formula unit, instead of eleven.  It may be formed by the dehydration of picropharmacolite.

Structure 
Infrared spectra show that picropharmacolite contains water molecules H2O, hydroxyl groups (OH)− co-ordinated with Mg2+ cations, and acid arsenate radicals (HAsO4)2−.  There are strong structural similarities with guerinite, Ca5(AsO3OH)2(AsO4)2.9H2O which indicates a similar formula for the two minerals.  X-ray diffraction methods indicate that As, Ca and Mg cations are positioned in corrugated layers parallel to the c axis, the layers being linked by hydrogen bonding only.  Four independent water molecules are sandwiched between adjacent layers, and build up hydrogen-bonded chains which are also parallel to the c axis.  The ratio of four Ca to one Mg remains fairly steady, and no significant Ca/Mg substitution occurs in any cation site.  Hence if the formula of picropharmacolite is written as Ca4Mg(H2O)7(AsO3OH)2(AsO4)2.4H2O, it is a better representation of the structure than the more usual formula Ca4Mg(AsO3OH)2(AsO4)2.11H2O.

Morphology 
Picropharmacolite is usually found as small to microscopic pearly white botryoidal aggregates with a radiating foliated structure internally.  Less commonly it occurs as silky fibrous aggregates or minute needle-like crystals, that are rectangular prisms elongated along the c axis.

Environment 
Formed as an oxidation product of arsenic-bearing sulfides in reaction with surrounding calcium-bearing rocks, and as a recent efflorescence in mine workings.  Erythrite and pharmacolite are common associated minerals.

Type locality 
It was first described for samples from ore dumps of the Richelsdorf Smelter, Süss, Richelsdorf District, Hesse, Germany.  The type material is stored at the National School of Mines, Paris, France, 95.497.

References

External links 
 http://rruff.geo.arizona.edu/AMS/viewJmol.php?id=00824

Arsenate minerals
Triclinic minerals
Minerals in space group 2